The name of the IAU constellation Scorpius  in modern Chinese is 天蝎座 (tiān xiē zuò).

In terms of    traditional Chinese uranography, the modern constellation is located within the eastern quadrant of the sky, which is symbolized as the Azure Dragon of the East (東方青龍, Dōng Fāng Qīng Lóng) and includes the asterisms "Heart", "Room" and "Tail".

Stars
The map of Chinese constellation in constellation Scorpius area consists of:

See also
Chinese astronomy
Traditional Chinese star names
Chinese constellations

References

External links 
 Scorpius – Chinese associations
 香港太空館研究資源
 中國星區、星官及星名英譯表
 天象文學
 台灣自然科學博物館天文教育資訊網
 中國古天文
 中國古代的星象系統

Astronomy in China
Scorpius (constellation)